Robert Gregory Browne is an American novelist, former screenwriter, and co-founder and creative director of Braun Haus Media, LLC.

Early life
Browne was born in California, but at the age of eleven, moved with his family to Honolulu, Hawaii. After discovering the work of Donald Westlake, Browne set his sights on becoming a writer and at seventeen wrote 130 pages of a comedy mystery novel that remains unfinished. Browne tried writing speculative episodes of The Rockford Files and Harry O, among others, but none of these scripts were ever purchased and Browne shifted his interest to music.

Hollywood
In 1990, Browne took up writing again and completed a feature-length screenplay, which was a winner in the Nicholl Fellowships in Screenwriting competition. The program is sponsored by the Academy of Motion Picture Arts & Sciences and is designed to give aspiring screenwriters a way into the film industry. Browne was one of five winners that year and received a twenty thousand dollar grant for his screenplay, Low Tide. Several weeks after winning, that screenplay sold to Showtime and was slated to be produced by the network. After two years of development, executives overseeing production left the network and the screenplay was put into turnaround.

Browne continued working in Hollywood for many years. In the late 1990s, he worked with producer-writer Larry Brody, and was hired by Saban/Fox Kids as a staff writer for the animated show, Diabolik, based on the famed Italian comic book. He and Brody later worked together on the Marvel production, Spider-Man Unlimited.

In 2010, CBS Television and Sony Pictures produced a television pilot based on Browne's novel, Kiss Her Goodbye. The pilot starred Dylan Walsh,  Michael Rapaport, Sandrine Holt, and Terry Kinney, with a script written and directed by Michael Dinner.

Career as a Novelist
In 2005, Browne's first novel, Kiss Her Goodbye, sold to St. Martin's Press. St. Martin's subsequently published three more novels, Whisper in the Dark (which received a starred review from Publishers Weekly), Kill Her Again, and Down Among the Dead Men. In 2011, Browne moved to Dutton Penguin, which released his apocalyptic supernatural thriller, The Paradise Prophecy. In 2012, Browne released a mystery thriller entitled Trial Junkies, which became an Amazon bestseller. 2013 brought two books: Trial Junkies 2: Negligence and Poe, co-written with Brett Battles, and later Takedown, a sequel to Poe. In 2015, Browne launched a new series Linger using the pen name Edward Fallon. Under his Braun Haus Media banner, Browne commissioned several authors to write further stories in the Linger series using the Fallon name, and wrote the seventh book himself.

Published works

Kiss Her Goodbye (St. Martin's, 2007)
Whisper in the Dark (St. Martin's, 2009)
Kill Her Again (St. Martin's, 2009)
Killer Year: Stories to Die For edited by Lee Child Story: Bottom Deal (St. Martin's, 2008)
Down Among the Dead Men (St. Martin's, 2010)
The Paradise Prophecy (Dutton, 2011)
Love is Murder edited by Sandra Brown Story: "Speechless" (Mira, 2012)
Trial Junkies (Braun Haus Media, 2012)
Trial Junkies 2: Negligence (Braun Haus Media, 2013)
Poe co-written with Brett Battles (Braun Haus Media, 2013)
Takedown co-written with Brett Battles (Braun Haus Media, 2014)
Linger: Dying is a Wild Night (pen name Edward Fallon) (Braun Haus Media, 2015)
Linger 7: Journey of a Thousand Miles (pen name Edward Fallon) (Braun Haus Media, 2015)

Interviews
 Interview with Robert Gregory Browne, by CJ Lyons
 Interview with Robert Gregory Browne

References

External links
 http://www.robertgregorybrowne.com
 http://www.castingthebones.com
 http://www.murderati.com
 

21st-century American novelists
Living people
1955 births
Writers from Honolulu
American male novelists
21st-century American male writers
Novelists from Hawaii